Robert Francis Foster "Roy" Felton (12 August 1918 – 24 April 1982) was an English footballer who played for Everton, Port Vale, Crystal Palace, South Liverpool, Nottingham Forest, and Northwich Victoria.

Career
Felton played for Everton, before joining Port Vale in June 1938. He played ten Third Division South and two cup games before being called up for military training in August 1939. During the war he guested for Bath City, but returned to The Old Recreation Ground safely in August 1945. Injuries limited his appearances however and he only managed to play seven war league, five FA Cup and three war cup games before refusing new terms in the summer of 1946. After having a trial with Crystal Palace, in which he played one league game, he signed with South Liverpool. After a trial with Nottingham Forest he joined Northwich Victoria.

Career statistics
Source:

References

1918 births
1982 deaths
Footballers from Gateshead
English footballers
Association football fullbacks
Everton F.C. players
Port Vale F.C. players
Crystal Palace F.C. players
South Liverpool F.C. players
Nottingham Forest F.C. players
Northwich Victoria F.C. players
English Football League players